Acalanes Union High School District is a public high school district in Contra Costa County, located in the Bay Area of California. The district takes its name from Rancho Acalanes, an 1834 Mexican rancho grant which occupied much of the area from Orinda to Lafayette. The district operates four high schools.

Schools
It currently has four schools:  Acalanes High School in Lafayette, Campolindo High School in Moraga, Las Lomas High School and The Acalanes Center for Independent Study in Walnut Creek, and Miramonte High School in Orinda. A fifth campus, Del Valle High School located in Walnut Creek was closed at the end of the 1978–1979 school year and remaining students were transferred to Acalanes, Campolindo, and Las Lomas High Schools.  The district's alternative school, Del Oro High School, opened on the former site of Del Valle High School, closed following the 2009–2010 school year, although the district still operates Acalanes Adult Education at the Del Valle Education Center in Walnut Creek. John Nickerson has served as the district's Superintendent since May, 2011.

In 2004, the Acalanes Union High School district was ranked the second highest in the state of California, behind only Los Gatos/Saratoga (LGJUHSD) in Los Gatos.

In 2007, the Acalanes Union High School district was ranked the number one district in the state of California based on the STAR Test scores.

Boundary 
The district includes Acalanes Ridge, Castle Hill, Lafayette, Moraga, Orinda, San Miguel, and Saranap. It also includes much of Contra Costa Centre, Shell Ridge, and Walnut Creek, and portions of Alamo and Reliez Valley.

Staffing 
The district employed 167 classified employees in the 10/11 school year. California Dataquest - AUHSD Classified Staff Report for 2010/2011

The district employed 301 teachers in the 09/10 school year, a third of which have graduate degrees.  California Dataquest - Staff Education Report

Enrollment 
Total enrollment in the district in the 10/11 school year was 5,589.  Enrollment in the 10/11 school year by grade is as follows:  
 9th Grade - 1,367
 10th Grade - 1,430
 11th Grade - 1,358
 12th Grade - 1,417
California Dataquest - District Enrollment by Grade Report

References

External links 
Acalanes Union High School District website

School districts in Contra Costa County, California
Lafayette, California
Orinda, California
Walnut Creek, California